Park Yong-taik (Hangul: 박용택, Hanja: 朴龍澤) (born April 21, 1979) is a South Korean outfielder who has played his entire career for the LG Twins in the KBO League. With 2,504 career hits, he is the all-time career hit leader in the KBO. He bats left-handed and throws right-handed.

Amateur career
Park attended Whimoon High School in Seoul, South Korea. In , he was selected for the South Korea national junior team that finished in fourth place at the World Junior Baseball Championship in Havana, Cuba.

In , his sophomore year at Korea University, he made his first appearance for the South Korea national baseball team in the Intercontinental Cup held in Sydney, Australia.

In , Park competed in the Asian Baseball Championship in Taiwan. South Korea won the silver medal, and Park was selected to the All-Star team as an outfielder.

Notable international careers

Professional career
Signed by the LG Twins, Park made his KBO League debut on April 2, . In the 2002 KBO season, he batted .288  which was the highest batting average among the rookie players.

In , He had a .300-plus batting average for the first time (.300), amassing 16 home runs and 58 RBIs.

Park was well known as a base-stealing cleanup hitter. While batting fourth in the order of his team since his rookie season, he stole 40-plus bases in two seasons ( and ), and won the stolen base title with a career-high 43 in 2005.

In , Park was called up to the South Korea national baseball team for the inaugural World Baseball Classic. He appeared in four games as a pinch hitter, going 1-for-4 with one RBI. In Team Korea's second game of Round 1 against China, Park hit a RBI triple to drive in Lee Bum-Ho as a pinch hitter in the bottom of the seventh.

In , Park fell into a horrendous slump. He batted a career-low .257 with a career-low two home runs, missing 30 games due to injuries.

In 2009, Park had his best career in batting average. He won the KBO batting title with a career-high .372 average and hit 18 home runs. On December 11, 2009, he won the Golden Glove Award as an outfielder.

In 2012, Park received another Golden Glove award.

From 2009 to 2018, Park hit over .300 every season. From 2013 and until 2017, and despite playing in his mid- to late-thirties, Park batted over .320 and reached at least 150 hits in each season, and was widely regarded as one of the best contact hitters in the KBO. With 2,439 career hits at the end of 2019, he is the all-time career hit leader in the KBO, having over-taken Yang Joon-hyuk's mark of 2,318 total hits.

Before the 2020 season, he declared that he would retire after the season.

Notable international careers

Filmography

Television shows

See also
 List of KBO career hits leaders
 List of KBO career home run leaders

References

External links 
 Profile and stats on the KBO official site

South Korean baseball players
LG Twins players
2006 World Baseball Classic players
Korea University alumni
Living people
1979 births